Prickle  may refer to:
Thorns, spines, and prickles, a sharp, needle-like structures
Prickle cell of the skin
Prickle (protein), a planar cell polarity protein
The collective noun for a pack of porcupines
Prickle (Gumby character), a character on The Gumby Show